The 2022–23 Eredivisie Vrouwen is the thirteenth season of the Netherlands women's professional football league. Twente is the defending champions. The season saw Fortuna Sittard and Telstar enter the league, meaning the league was expanded to include eleven teams.

Format 
The teams Fortuna Sittard and Telstar joined the league, expanding it to eleven teams, with the former being a new team and the latter returning after last playing in the 2016–17 season. Each team will play all of the other teams twice over 22 rounds with each round one team having a bye due to the odd number of teams.

Teams

Standings

Results

Statistics

Top scorers

References

External links 
 Official website
 Season on Soccerway

Eredivisie (women) seasons
Netherlands
2022–23 in Dutch women's football